Olisthaerus is a genus of beetles belonging to the family Staphylinidae.

The species of this genus are found in Europe and Northern America.

Species:
 Olisthaerus megacephalus (Zetterstedt, 1828) 
 Olisthaerus substriatus (Paykull, 1790)

References

Staphylinidae
Staphylinidae genera